Hotel Yancey, also known as Hotel Pawnee, is a historic building in North Platte, Nebraska. It was built in 1929 by Alex Beck for the North Platte Realty Company, headed by Beck and Keith Neville, together with investor William Yancey, the owner of Hotel Yancey in Grand Island. Neville had served as the 18th governor of Nebraska from 1917 to 1919. The building was designed in the Colonial Revival and Georgian Revival styles by architect F.A. Henninger. It has been listed on the National Register of Historic Places since May 9, 1985.

References

National Register of Historic Places in Lincoln County, Nebraska
Colonial Revival architecture in Nebraska
Hotel buildings completed in 1929
1929 establishments in Nebraska